The Ucea is a left tributary of the river Olt in Romania. It discharges into the Olt in Ucea de Jos. The upper reach of the river is sometimes identified as the Ucea Mare. It flows through the town Victoria.

References

Rivers of Romania
Rivers of Brașov County